Gąsiorowo may refer to the following places:
Gąsiorowo, Kuyavian-Pomeranian Voivodeship (north-central Poland)
Gąsiorowo, Legionowo County in Masovian Voivodeship (east-central Poland)
Gąsiorowo, Ostrów Mazowiecka County in Masovian Voivodeship (east-central Poland)
Gąsiorowo, Pułtusk County in Masovian Voivodeship (east-central Poland)
Gąsiorowo, Greater Poland Voivodeship (west-central Poland)
Gąsiorowo, Działdowo County in Warmian-Masurian Voivodeship (north Poland)
Gąsiorowo, Olecko County in Warmian-Masurian Voivodeship (north Poland)
Gąsiorowo, Olsztyn County in Warmian-Masurian Voivodeship (north Poland)